In mathematics, a pandigital number is an integer that in a given base has among its significant digits each digit used in the base at least once. For example, 1234567890 (one billion two hundred thirty four million five hundred sixty seven thousand eight hundred ninety) is a pandigital number in base 10. The first few pandigital base 10 numbers are given by :

 1023456789, 1023456798, 1023456879, 1023456897, 1023456978, 1023456987, 1023457689

The smallest pandigital number in a given base b is an integer of the form

  

The following table lists the smallest pandigital numbers of a few selected bases.

 gives the base 10 values for the first 18 bases.

In a trivial sense, all positive integers are pandigital in unary (or tallying). In binary, all integers are pandigital except for 0 and numbers of the form  (the Mersenne numbers). The larger the base, the rarer pandigital numbers become, though one can always find runs of  consecutive pandigital numbers with redundant digits by writing all the digits of the base together (but not putting the zero first as the most significant digit) and adding x + 1 zeroes at the end as least significant digits.

Conversely, the smaller the base, the fewer pandigital numbers without redundant digits there are. 2 is the only such pandigital number in base 2, while there are more of these in base 10.

Sometimes, the term is used to refer only to pandigital numbers with no redundant digits. In some cases, a number might be called pandigital even if it doesn't have a zero as a significant digit, for example, 923456781 (these are sometimes referred to as "zeroless pandigital numbers").

No base 10 pandigital number can be a prime number if it doesn't have redundant digits. The sum of the digits 0 to 9 is 45, passing the divisibility rule for both 3 and 9. The first base 10 pandigital prime is 10123457689;  lists more.

For different reasons, redundant digits are also required for a pandigital number (in any base except unary) to also be a palindromic number in that base. The smallest pandigital palindromic number in base 10 is 1023456789876543201.

The largest pandigital number without redundant digits to be also a square number is 9814072356 = 990662.

Two of the zeroless pandigital Friedman numbers are: 123456789 = ((86 + 2 × 7)5 − 91) / 34, and 987654321 = (8 × (97 + 6/2)5 + 1) / 34.

A pandigital Friedman number without redundant digits is the square: 2170348569 = 465872 + (0 × 139).

While much of what has been said does not apply to Roman numerals, there are pandigital numbers: MCDXLIV, MCDXLVI, MCDLXIV, MCDLXVI, MDCXLIV, MDCXLVI, MDCLXIV, MDCLXVI.

Pandigital numbers are useful in fiction and in advertising. The Social Security number 987-65-4321 is a zeroless pandigital number reserved for use in advertising. Some credit card companies use pandigital numbers with redundant digits as fictitious credit card numbers (while others use strings of zeroes).

Examples of base 10 pandigital numbers

123456789 = The first zeroless pandigital number.
987654321 = The largest zeroless pandigital number without redundant digits.
1023456789 = The first pandigital number.
1234567890 = The first pandigital number with the digits in order.
9814072356 = The largest pandigital square without redundant digits. It is the square of 99066.
9876543210 = The largest pandigital number without redundant digits.
12345678987654321 = A pandigital number with all the digits except zero in both ascending and descending order. It is the square of 111111111; see Demlo number. It is also a palindromic number.

See also
 Champernowne constant

References
 
 De Geest, P. The Nine Digits Page 
 
 
 
 

Base-dependent integer sequences